The sac de gemecs (literally "bag of moans", also known as buna  in Andorra or coixinera , gaita  or botella ) is a type of bagpipe found in Catalonia (eastern Spain spilling over into southern France).

The instrument consists of a chanter, a mouthblown blowpipe, and three drones.  The lowest drone (bordó llarg) plays a note two octaves below the tonic of the chanter.  The middle drone (bordó mitjà) plays a fifth above the bass.  The high drone (bordó petit) plays an octave below the chanter, thus one octave above the bass drone.

Folklore
The instrument figures into the Andorran legend El buner d'Ordino, in which a bagpiper from the parish of Ordino, en route to a festival in Canillo, is chased and treed by wolves, but frightens them off by playing his buna.

See also
Xeremia
Gaita

References

External links
Elsacdegemecs.com
Cornamusam at olot.org
Cornamusica.com
XGBosch Cornamuses
Elsacdegemecs.blogspot

Bagpipes
Catalan musical instruments
Andorran musical instruments